Mun Kyong-jin (문경진; born 1981) is a possibly deceased North Korean violinist who was formerly the head of the Unhasu Orchestra. He was reported to have been executed in August 2013 along with the singer Hyon Song-wol and others. However, it subsequently emerged that Hyon Song-wol had not been executed because she appeared on state television a year later.

Mun had received numerous awards and recognitions from the North Korean government during his career. In 2005, Mun won a competition held in Hungary. He performed with the Unhasu Orchestra at the Salle Pleyel concert hall in Paris on March 14, 2012. At the time, Mun told Associated Press, "Despite differing languages, we hope that we can easily understand each other through music and become friends," in an interview conducted shortly before the Parisian performance.

Reported execution 
South Korea's The Chosun Ilbo reported on August 29, 2013, that Mun Kyong-jin, along with a dozen other prominent North Korean musicians, had been arrested on August 17, on charges of allegedly violating laws against pornography. According to the report, other arrested musicians were arrested as political dissidents or accused of possessing Bibles. The report said that Mun Kyong-jin was executed by firing squad on August 20, 2013. In addition, it claimed that a dozen other musicians were also executed with Mun, including several of Mun's colleagues from the Unhasu Orchestra; and dancers and singers from the Wangjaesan Light Music Band. The Unhasu Orchestra was reportedly disbanded following Mun's execution.

References

External links
.

Place of birth missing
Year of birth missing
North Korean violinists
Purges in North Korea
Executed North Korean people
21st-century executions by North Korea
People executed for treason against North Korea